Baron Nelson of Stafford, of Hilcote Hall in the County of Stafford, is a title in the Peerage of the United Kingdom. It was created in 1960 for the businessman Sir George Nelson, 1st Baronet, who for many years was Chairman of English Electric. He had already been created a Baronet in the Baronetage of the United Kingdom in 1955. He was succeeded by his only son, the second Baron. He was also Chairman of English Electric as well as a director of the Bank of England.

Barons Nelson of Stafford (1960)

  George Horatio Nelson, 1st Baron Nelson of Stafford (1887–1962)
  Henry George Nelson, 2nd Baron Nelson of Stafford (1917–1995)
  Henry Roy George Nelson, 3rd Baron Nelson of Stafford (1943–2006)
  Alistair William Henry Nelson, 4th Baron Nelson of Stafford (b. 1973)
  (1) Hon. James Jonathan Nelson (b. 1947)

The heir presumptive and sole heir to the titles is the present holder's uncle Hon. James Jonathan Nelson (b. 1947).

References

Baronies in the Peerage of the United Kingdom
Noble titles created in 1960